is a railway station located in the town of  Kasamatsu, Hashima District, Gifu Prefecture,  Japan, operated by the private railway operator Meitetsu.

Lines

Station layout

Kasamatsu Station has one ground-level island platform and one ground-level side platform connected by a footbridge. The station is attended.

Platforms

Adjacent stations

History
It was named Kasamatsu Station on February 1, 1916, but was slightly relocated on October 1 of the same year. It was again relocated on April 29, 1935, and renamed . It was relocated to its present location in May 1936 and reverted to the name of Kasamatsu Station.

Passenger statistics
In fiscal 2015, the station was used by an average of 3764 passengers daily (boarding passengers only).

Surrounding area
Kasamatsu Racecourse
Gifu Industrial High School

See also
 List of Railway Stations in Japan

References

External links

  

Railway stations in Japan opened in 1914
Stations of Nagoya Railroad
Railway stations in Gifu Prefecture
Kasamatsu, Gifu